Christopher Prior, CB (2 July 1912  – 14 September 2004)  was an eminent Anglican priest: Chaplain of the Fleet from 1966 to 1969 and Archdeacon of Portsmouth from then to 1977.

Born on 2 July 1912, he was educated at Keble College, Oxford. He was ordained after a period of study at Ripon College Cuddesdon and began his ecclesiastical career as a Curate at Hornsea. In 1941 he became a Royal Naval Chaplain in 1941, eventually becoming Chaplain of the Fleet in 1966. After this he became Archdeacon of Portsmouth. He retired in 1977 and died on 14 September 2004.

References

1912 births
Alumni of Keble College, Oxford
Alumni of Ripon College Cuddesdon
Chaplains of the Fleet
Companions of the Order of the Bath
Archdeacons of Portsmouth
2004 deaths
World War II chaplains